Football Club Şagadam  is a Turkmen professional football club based in Türkmenbaşy, Balkan Region. The team compete in Ýokary Liga, the top division in Turkmenistan football league system. The club was founded in 1949 and home matches are played at Şagadam Stadium, their original home ground.

History
The football club was founded in 1949 by the Complex of Oil Refineries in Krasnovodsk (Turkmen SSR). Prior to 1991, they had the name of DOSA.

In 1992, until June, they were playing under the name Neftyanik and then – Hazar.

In August 1993 the club was renamed Şagadam.

At the end of 2002 Şagadam FK was confirmed as champions of 2002 Ýokary Liga for the first time in its history. The team was led to its success under the guidance of head coach Kudrat Ismailov.

In the 2012 season, Şagadam took fifth place and had the league's best scorer with their player Aleksandr Boliyan.

Domestic

Team name history
 1949-1974: DOSA Krasnovodsk 
 1974: Neftyanik Krasnovodsk 
 1992: Hazar Krasnovodsk 
 1993: Hazar Türkmenbaşy
 August 1993–present: FC Şagadam Türkmenbaşy

Honours
 Turkmenistan League: 1
 Winner: 2002
 Turkmenistan Cup: 2
 Winner: 2007, 2021
 Runner-up(3): 2002, 2015, 2017
 Turkmenistan Super Cup:
 Runner-up: 2007, 2016, 2022
 Turkmenistan Federation Cup: 1
 Winner: 2014

Squad

Club officials

Management

Current technical staff

Managers
 Kudrat Ismailov (2001–03)
 Armen Soghomonyan (2005)
 Kudrat Ismailov (Oct 2005 – Dec 05)
 Kurban Meredov (2006–08)
 Kudrat Ismailov (2008–11)
 Rejepmyrat Agabaýew (2011–13)
 Amanmyrat Meredow (2013–16)
 Aleksandr Klimenko (2017–August2021)
 Rahmanguly Baýlýýew (August 2021–)

References

External links
 History
Profile at FIFA.com

Football clubs in Turkmenistan